NGC 488 is a face-on spiral galaxy in the constellation Pisces. It is at a distance of about 90 million light-years away from Earth. Its diameter is estimated to be 52,6 Kpc (171.000 ly). The galaxy has a large central bulge, and is considered a prototype galaxy with multiple spiral arms. Its arms are tightly wound. Star forming activity has been traced within the arms. The nucleus of NGC 488 has been found to be chemically decoupled, being twice as metal rich as the central bulge of the galaxy. NGC 488, with the exception of its smaller companions, that form NGC 488 group, is an isolated galaxy.

The galaxy was discovered by William Herschel on 13 December 1784. Two supernovae have been observed in NGC 488, SN 2010eb, possibly Ia with peak magnitude 14.7, and SN 1976G, with magnitude 15.

Gallery

References

External links 
 
 NGC 488 in the Staracle NGC catalog

Unbarred spiral galaxies
Pisces (constellation)
0488
00907
04946
Astronomical objects discovered in 1784